Friedrich Richard Petri (1824–1857) was a German-born Texas painter whose works recorded life in the original German immigrant settlements, and portrayed Native American tribes in family settings.

Early life
Friedrich Richard Petri was born on July 31, 1824, in Dresden, Germany to master shoemaker Heinrich Petri and his wife Juliane Dorothea (Weise) Petri.

At age fourteen, Petri was enrolled at the Dresden Academy of Fine Arts  where he would remain for eleven years under the tutelage and guidance of Adrian Ludwig Richter and Julius Hübner. Petri won six awards and a scholarship to a further education in Italy, upon completion of which he was to return to the Dresden institution as an instructor.  Petri was unable to accept the offer due to physical frailty. Hermann Lungkwitz, who married Petri's sister Elisabeth, befriended Petri while at the Dresden academy. Petri and Lungwitz joined other students in the failed 1849 May Uprising in Dresden, an event at the tail end of the Revolutions of 1848 resulting from the refusal of Frederick Augustus II to recognize a  constitutional monarchy.

Texas
In 1850, the Lungkwitz and Petri families emigrated to the United States, landing first in New York City.  They migrated to Wheeling, West Virginia, but decided on the destination of Texas in 1851. Their journey took them by ship to New Orleans and Indianola, and then riding an oxcart to New Braunfels.  In 1852, the two families bought a 320-acre farm for $400 in the settlement of Pedernales, Texas near Fredericksburg and took up farming and cattle ranching.  Future Texas politician Jacob Kuechler married Petri's sister Marie in 1856, and became a part of the family business. Like many German immigrants to the American South, the  Lungkwitz and Petri families chose not to own slaves but worked their farms themselves.

Petri's health remained frail for the duration of his life, but he continued his pencil sketches and watercolor paintings.  His work reflects a fascination with the casual amicability between German settlers and local tribes of Delaware, Shawnee, Penateka Comanche and Lipan Apache, with meticulous attention to physical appearance, attire and lifestyle .

Death
Petri drowned in the Pedernales River during the winter of 1857, and is buried in the family cemetery in Gillespie County, Texas.

Notable works
Self Portrait
Plains Indian with Shield
Plains Indian Warrior in Blue
Mounted Plains Indian with Lance
Indian Woman on Saddled Mule
Indian Watering Pony
Bartering with an Indian
The Pioneer Cowpen
Going Visiting
Fort Martin Scott (unfinished) 1853 gathering of Lipan Apaches, interpreters, soldiers and settlers.

Notes

References

19th-century German painters
19th-century American male artists
German male painters
19th-century American painters
American male painters
1824 births
1857 deaths
German emigrants to the United States
Artists from Texas
German-American culture in Texas
People from Fredericksburg, Texas
Painters from Texas